The 1920 North Texas State Normal football team was an American football team that represented the North Texas State Normal College (now known as the University of North Texas) during the 1920 college football season as an independent. In their first year under head coach Theron J. Fouts, the team compiled an overall record of 7–1.

Schedule

References

North Texas State Normal
North Texas Mean Green football seasons
North Texas State Normal football